Tachydromia is a genus of hybotid flies. It is widespread around the world, with species found essentially  everywhere except the polar regions and some remote islands. They are not very diverse in East and Southeast Asia, or in Africa

Description
Tachydromia are minute, slender flies of shining jet-black color, that are almost devoid of hairs and bristles.

The globular head bears large eyes with large facets. Three ocelli are present. The two-jointed antennae are short. The vertical, rigid proboscis is shorter than the head.

The thorax is longer than broad. The slender legs bear microscopic hairs, but no bristles. The front femora are somewhat thickened. The males of some species have small spines on the middle femora or tibiae beneath.

The wings are narrow, with the costa ending at the fourth vein and sometimes thickened beyond the insertion of the first vein. There is no trace of an anal cell present. Some species show one or two dark bands across the wings.

Species
T. acklandi Chvala, 1973
T. aemula (Loew, 1864)
T. alteropicta (Becker, 1889)
T. annulimana Meigen, 1822
T. arrogans (Linnaeus, 1761)
T. calcanea (Meigen, 1838)
T. calcarata (Strobl, 1910)
T. carpathica Chvala, 1966
T. catalonica (Strobl, 1906)
T. caucasica Chvala, 1970
T. connexa Meigen, 1822
T. costalis (von Roser, 1840)
T. denticulata (Oldenberg, 1912)
T. edenensis Hewitt & Chvala, 2002
T. excisa (Loew, 1864)
T. halidayi (Collin, 1926)
T. halterata (Collin, 1926)
T. incompleta (Becker, 1900)
T. interrupta (Loew, 1864)
T. lundstroemi (Frey, 1913)
T. microptera (Loew, 1864)
T. monserratensis (Strobl, 1906)
T. morio (Zetterstedt, 1838)
T. nigerrima (Bezzi, 1918)
T. obsoleta (Strobl, 1910)
T. ornatipes (Becker, 1890)
T. parva Chvala, 1970
T. productipes (Strobl, 1910)
T. pseudointerrupta Chvala, 1970
T. punctifera (Becker, 1900)
T. rhyacophila Chvala, 1995
T. sabulosa Meigen, 1830
T. schnitteri Stark, 1994
T. smithi Chvala, 1966
T. styriaca (Strobl, 1893)
T. subarrogans Kovalev & Chvala, 1985
T. terricola Zetterstedt, 1819
T. tuberculata (Loew, 1864)
T. umbrarum Haliday, 1833
T. undulata (Strobl, 1906)
T. woodi (Collin, 1926)

References

Hybotidae
Taxa named by Johann Wilhelm Meigen
Brachycera genera